Jaromír Čížek (13 March 1927 – 20 September 2003) was a Czech professional motocross rider, winner of the 1958 Motocross World Championship in 250cc class (Europa Cup). He was also twis third (1957 and 1959).

Achievements

References

External links
 

1927 births
2003 deaths
Czech motocross riders
Czechoslovak motocross riders
Sportspeople from Prague